Alexey Alexandrovich Lutsenko (born 7 September 1992) is a Kazakh professional cyclist, who rides for UCI WorldTeam .

Career
In 2012 he won the under-23 road race at the UCI Road World Championships in the Netherlands. At the 2015 Tour de Suisse, Lutsenko put in an attack after the penultimate climb of the day and it led him to victory on stage 8.

In 2019, Lutsenko had his most prolific season to that point, with ten individual victories. His first start of the season, the Tour of Oman, saw him win three stages, the points classification and the overall general classification. After top-ten finishes at Omloop Het Nieuwsblad (fourth) and Strade Bianche (seventh), Lutsenko won a stage and the mountains classification at Tirreno–Adriatico. He finished seventh overall at the Critérium du Dauphiné, before winning both the time trial and the road race by more than a minute at the Kazakh National Road Championships. After finishing inside the top twenty placings at the Tour de France, Lutsenko won the Arctic Race of Norway on the final stage, overturning a three-second pre-stage deficit to Warren Barguil. He finished fourth at the Deutschland Tour and second at the Coppa Ugo Agostoni before two wins in three days, at the Coppa Sabatini and the Memorial Marco Pantani – becoming the latter race's first non-Italian winner.

At the start of the 2020 season, and prior to the COVID-19 pandemic-enforced suspension of racing, Lutsenko took third-place overall finishes at the Tour de la Provence (winning the points classification), and the UAE Tour. He then won the sixth stage of the Tour de France following a  solo attack. Lutsenko's next victory did not come until the 2021 Critérium du Dauphiné, when he won the fourth stage individual time trial. He moved into the race lead after the sixth stage, but ultimately finished second overall behind Richie Porte. He recorded his best overall finish at the Tour de France with a seventh-place finish in the 2021 edition, but took only one further victory during the rest of the year, at the Coppa Ugo Agostoni.

Lutsenko opened his 2022 season with victory in the inaugural edition of the Clásica Jaén Paraíso Interior, soloing the last  to the win. He finished inside the top ten placings at the Vuelta a Andalucía (ninth), missing out on a stage victory to Wout Poels in a two-up sprint in Baza. At the Tour de France, he worked his way up the general classification, moving into the top ten overall after two high stage finishes on consecutive summit finishes at Peyragudes and Hautacam. He ultimately finished 9th, almost 23 minutes down on race winner Jonas Vingegaard.

Personal life
Lutsenko and his family live in Monaco.

Major results
Source: 

2010
 Asian Junior Road Championships
1st  Road race
2nd  Time trial
2011
 9th ZLM Tour
2012
 1st  Road race, UCI Under-23 Road World Championships
 1st Stage 5 Tour de l'Avenir
 1st Stage 1b Tour of Bulgaria
 1st Stage 5 Giro della Valle d'Aosta
 National Road Championships
2nd Road race
2nd Time trial
 2nd Grand Prix des Marbriers
 3rd Overall Coupe des nations Ville Saguenay
 5th Gran Premio Nobili Rubinetterie
 8th Overall Thüringen Rundfahrt der U23
2014
 1st  Time trial, Asian Games
 1st Tour of Almaty
 4th Overall Danmark Rundt
1st  Points classification
1st Stage 5 (ITT)
2015
 1st  Time trial, National Road Championships
 1st Tour of Almaty
 1st Stage 8 Tour de Suisse
2016
 1st  Overall Tour of Hainan
1st Stage 8
 1st Tour of Almaty
 1st Stage 5 Paris–Nice
 3rd Overall Three Days of De Panne
2017
 1st  Team time trial, Asian Road Championships
 1st  Overall Tour of Almaty
1st Points classification
1st Stage 1
 Vuelta a España
1st Stage 5
 Combativity award Stage 5
 3rd Dwars door Vlaanderen
 9th Road race, UCI Road World Championships
2018
 1st  Road race, National Road Championships
 Asian Games
1st  Road race
1st  Time trial
 1st  Overall Tour of Oman
 1st Stage 6 Tour of Austria
 2nd Overall Tour of Turkey
1st Stage 4
2019
 National Road Championships
1st  Road race
1st  Time trial
 1st  Overall Tour of Oman
1st  Points classification
1st Stages 2, 3 & 5
 1st  Overall Arctic Race of Norway
1st  Points classification
 1st Coppa Sabatini
 1st Memorial Marco Pantani
 Tirreno–Adriatico
1st  Mountains classification
1st Stage 4
 2nd Coppa Ugo Agostoni
 4th Overall Deutschland Tour
 4th Omloop Het Nieuwsblad
 7th Overall Critérium du Dauphiné
 7th Strade Bianche
2020
 1st Stage 6 Tour de France
 3rd Overall Tour de la Provence
1st  Points classification
 3rd Overall UAE Tour
2021
 1st Coppa Ugo Agostoni
 2nd Overall Critérium du Dauphiné
1st Stage 4 (ITT)
 2nd GP Miguel Induráin
 4th Veneto Classic
 7th Overall Tour de France
 8th Overall Okolo Slovenska
2022
 1st Clásica Jaén Paraíso Interior
 8th Overall Tour de France
 9th Overall Vuelta a Andalucía

Grand Tour general classification results timeline

References

External links

 
 
 
 

1992 births
Living people
Kazakhstani male cyclists
Kazakhstani Tour de France stage winners
Kazakhstani Vuelta a España stage winners
Asian Games medalists in cycling
Cyclists at the 2014 Asian Games
Cyclists at the 2018 Asian Games
Cyclists at the 2010 Summer Youth Olympics
Tour de Suisse stage winners
Asian Games gold medalists for Kazakhstan
Olympic cyclists of Kazakhstan
Medalists at the 2014 Asian Games
Medalists at the 2018 Asian Games
People from Petropavl
Cyclists at the 2020 Summer Olympics
Kazakhstani people of Ukrainian descent